Major Josiah George Ritchie (18 October 1870 – 28 February 1955) was a tennis player from Great Britain. Major was his first name, not a military title. He was born in Westminster, educated at Brighton College and died in Ashford.

Career
Ritchie was a three-time medalist at the 1908 London Olympics, winning a Gold (Men's Singles), Silver (Men's Doubles) and Bronze (Men's Indoor Singles) medal. He was the last British player to win an Olympic medal in singles until Andy Murray won Gold in the 2012 games, also in London. In 1908 and 1910 he and Anthony Wilding won the doubles in Wimbledon. In 1902 Ritchie reached the all comers final at Wimbledon, beating Sydney Smith before losing to Laurence Doherty. In 1903 and 1904 Ritchie lost in the all comers final to Frank Riseley. In 1909 he reached the Wimbledon Challenge Round, beating Harry Parker, Stanley Doust, Charles P. Dixon and Herbert Roper Barrett before losing in five sets to Arthur Gore. In March 1907 Ritchie caused an upset by defeating Laurence Doherty in the Monte Carlo singles final. In June 1907 he won the Irish Championships. Ritchie was a five times winner of the Championships of Germany, played in Hamburg, from 1903 to 1906 and in 1908 (in 1904 and 1906 he also won the doubles title). He was also a five-time winner of the singles title at the Austrian Championship (from 1900 to 1903 and 1905). In 1908 he was member of the British Davis Cup team. He won three consecutive titles at the Surrey Championships from 1908 to 1910.

Other career highlights include winning the Riviera Championships at Menton, France four times (1904–1905, 1907–1908), the French Covered Court Championships four times (1899, 1902, 1905, 1908) . In 1911 Ritchie won the Queen's Club Covered Courts Championship, defeating Wilding in five sets. In 1919 he won the Ilkley Open Lawn Tennis Tournament. In 1920, at age 50, he reached the semifinal of the World Covered Court Championships at the Queen's Club in London.

Ritchie was also active in other sports. In 1903 he competed in a regatta in Laleham and won the single sculls and coxless pairs events. In addition, he competed in table tennis and was the secretary of the Table Tennis Association, founded in 1902. That year he co-wrote a book on table tennis titled Table tennis and how to play it, with rules. In 1909 he authored The Text Book of Lawn Tennis.

Grand Slam finals

Singles (1 runner-up)

Doubles (2 titles)

Performance timeline

Events with a challenge round: (WC) won; (CR) lost the challenge round; (FA) all comers' finalist

Notes

References

External links

 
 
 
 
 
 
 

1870 births
1955 deaths
English male tennis players
English Olympic medallists
Olympic bronze medallists for Great Britain
Olympic gold medallists for Great Britain
Olympic silver medallists for Great Britain
Olympic tennis players of Great Britain
People from Westminster
Tennis players at the 1908 Summer Olympics
Wimbledon champions (pre-Open Era)
Olympic medalists in tennis
Grand Slam (tennis) champions in men's doubles
Medalists at the 1908 Summer Olympics
Tennis people from Greater London
British male tennis players